The 2010 New Mexico Lobos football team represented the University of New Mexico in the 2010 NCAA Division I FBS football season. The team was coached by second-year head coach Mike Locksley and played their home games in University Stadium in Albuquerque, New Mexico. They played in the Mountain West Conference and finished the season with a record of 1–11 (1–7 MW).

Schedule

References

New Mexico
New Mexico Lobos football seasons
New Mexico Lobos football